Patrick Umomo Agbo  (born 21 October 1981) is a retired Nigerian footballer who played as a forward.

References

External links

1981 births
Living people
Association football forwards
Nigerian footballers
FC Bunyodkor players
Nigerian expatriate footballers
Expatriate footballers in Ukraine
Nigerian expatriate sportspeople in Ukraine
Expatriate footballers in Uzbekistan
Nigerian expatriate sportspeople in Uzbekistan
Expatriate footballers in China
Nigerian expatriate sportspeople in China
Expatriate footballers in Armenia
Nigerian expatriate sportspeople in Armenia
Expatriate footballers in Jordan
Nigerian expatriate sportspeople in Jordan
Navbahor Namangan players
Sportspeople from Kaduna